Westlake Park can mean:
Westlake Park (Seattle), a park in Seattle, Washington
 MacArthur Park, formerly Westlake Park, in Los Angeles, California
Westlake Park (Houston), an office complex in Houston